"The Children" is the tenth and final episode of the fourth season of HBO's medieval fantasy television series Game of Thrones. The 40th episode of the series overall, "The Children" was written by series co-creators David Benioff and D. B. Weiss, and directed by Alex Graves. It first aired on HBO on June 15, 2014.

In the episode, Stannis Baratheon attacks the wildling camp beyond the Wall, as Jon Snow tries to meet with Mance Rayder; Bran Stark meets the Three-Eyed Raven; Qyburn tries to revive Gregor Clegane; Brienne of Tarth and Podrick Payne encounter Arya Stark in the Vale; Daenerys Targaryen is forced to chain her dragons up in the dungeons in Meereen; and Jaime Lannister sets Tyrion Lannister free before Tyrion is to be executed. "The Children" was praised for the handling of the deaths of Shae and Tywin Lannister, Bran reaching the Heart Tree, and the fight scene between Brienne and Sandor "The Hound" Clegane.

This episode marks the final appearances of Sibel Kekilli (Shae), Rose Leslie (Ygritte) and Thomas Brodie-Sangster (Jojen Reed).

Plot

Beyond the Wall
Jon meets Mance Rayder and tells him he wants to negotiate peace terms, but Rayder quickly realizes that Jon intends to kill him. They are interrupted by a massive cavalry charge led by Stannis and Davos that overruns the wildling encampment. Mance surrenders and is taken captive on Jon's suggestion. A mass cremation is held for the slain brothers of the Night's Watch. At the request of a captured Tormund, Jon later privately cremates Ygritte north of the Wall.

As Bran's group reaches the Heart Tree, they are attacked by skeleton warriors. Jojen is killed, but Hodor, Meera, and Bran are saved by a Child of the Forest. The Child leads them to meet an old man, the “Three Eyed Raven“, who tells Bran that, while he will never be able to walk again, he will "fly".

In Meereen
Daenerys receives a supplicant who wishes to be sold back into slavery because his life as a slave was safer than as a freedman. She allows him to have a temporary contract of service with his former master. The next supplicant is a grieving father carrying the charred bones of his three year-old daughter, who was killed by Drogon. Drogon has not returned, but a guilt-ridden Daenerys chains the other dragons in the catacombs as a precaution.

In King's Landing
Gregor lies dying from Oberyn's poisoned spear, but Qyburn says that he can save him. Cersei ousts Pycelle from his laboratory and gives his care over to Qyburn. Cersei rebuffs Tywin's insistence to marry Loras and confirms her incest with Jaime to him.

In the dungeons, Tyrion awaits his execution, but Jaime helps him escape. Tyrion, before escaping, sneaks into the Tower of the Hand, where he finds Shae in Tywin's bed. Realizing that Tywin has turned Shae against him, Tyrion remorsefully strangles her to death. He then confronts Tywin as he sits on the privy, and kills him with a crossbow after he repeatedly dismisses his son's feelings. Tyrion escapes on a ship bound for Essos with help from Varys, who boards with him after Tywin's death is discovered.

In the Vale
Brienne and Podrick meet Sandor and Arya. Brienne recognizes Arya and explains her oath to Catelyn, but Arya rebuffs her and Sandor is unconvinced of her loyalties. Brienne and Sandor duel, eventually resulting in a brutal fistfight with Brienne knocking Sandor off a cliff and unsuccessfully searching for Arya. After they leave, the fatally wounded Sandor pleads with Arya to kill him, but instead she takes his silver and leaves him to die. She then boards a ship to Braavos after showing the captain the coin Jaqen gave her.

Production

Writing

The episode was written by series co-creators David Benioff and D. B. Weiss, This episode contains content from two of George Martin's novels, A Storm of Swords, chapters Jon X, part of Jon XI, Jaime IX, Tyrion XI, and Arya XIII,
and A Dance with Dragons, chapters Daenerys I, Daenerys II, part of Tyrion I and Bran II.

Filming
"The Children" was directed by Alex Graves. The Thingvellir National Park in Iceland was used as the location for the fight between Brienne and The Hound. According Graves, the skeleton fight scene was an homage to Ray Harryhausen's famous stop motion sequence from Jason and the Argonauts.

Reception

Ratings
"The Children" was watched by 7.09 million Americans during its premiere hour, a 32% increase from the previous season finale. In the United Kingdom, the episode was viewed by 1.850 million viewers, making it the highest-rated broadcast that week. It also received 0.085 million timeshift viewers.

Critical reception
The episode received universal acclaim. All 35 reviews on Rotten Tomatoes were positive, with an average score of 9.5 out of 10. The site's consensus reading, "Capping off the best season of Game of Thrones to date, "The Children" provides enough satisfying plot developments for a finale, while its twists and turns leave you wanting more."

IGN writer Matt Fowler called it a "strong seasonal send-off with tons of violent twists, and turns." Sean T. Collins of Rolling Stone wrote, "Sometimes Game of Thrones is a widescreen epic fantasy, other times it's a small-scale study of violent lives. At its best – and "The Children" is certainly this show at its wide and wild best – Game of Thrones is all of these things, simultaneously." TVLine named Rory McCann and Gwendoline Christie the "Performers of the Week" for their physical acting in their fight sequence, and wrote that it "was one of the finest examples of the form in recent TV history – absolutely too epic to ignore."

Omission of Lady Stoneheart

After the episode premiered, some fans of the novel series voiced their displeasure over the omission of Lady Stoneheart, a character from the end of A Storm of Swords. This was in part fueled by a photo posted to Instagram two months earlier by actress Lena Headey that many fans assumed was a confirmation of the character's inclusion in the finale. A day later, director Alex Graves stated that the character was never planned to appear in the fourth season, and that he did not know whether she would appear in the fifth.

In an interview with Entertainment Weekly, actress Michelle Fairley stated that the character may not ever be included in the TV series, though she did not give a definite confirmation either way.

Piracy
The episode set a BitTorrent record with about 1.5 million downloads within 12 hours and set a record for 250,000 users sharing the file at the same time.

Awards and nominations

References

External links

 "The Children" at HBO.com
 

2014 American television episodes
Game of Thrones (season 4) episodes
Patricide in fiction
Television episodes written by David Benioff and D. B. Weiss